Otto Noll (24 July 1882 – 1922) was an Austrian footballer. He competed in the men's tournament at the 1912 Summer Olympics. On club level, Noll played for Prague's ethnic German club DFC Prag.

References

External links
 

1882 births
1922 deaths
Austrian footballers
Austria international footballers
Olympic footballers of Austria
Footballers at the 1912 Summer Olympics
Footballers from Prague
German Bohemian people
Association football goalkeepers
DFC Prag players